Matjaž Ceraj (born 14 September 1983 in Celje) is a Slovenian judoka.

Achievements

External links

 
 

1983 births
Living people
Slovenian male judoka
Judoka at the 2008 Summer Olympics
Judoka at the 2012 Summer Olympics
Olympic judoka of Slovenia
Mediterranean Games gold medalists for Slovenia
Mediterranean Games medalists in judo
Competitors at the 2013 Mediterranean Games
Judoka at the 2015 European Games
European Games competitors for Slovenia
21st-century Slovenian people